Golden Best is the double-CD compilation album by Japanese singer-songwriter Yōsui Inoue. The album was released in July 1999, celebrating his 30-year career as a solo recording artist. It comprises 35 tracks spanning his works after 1972; the year he released his debut album Danzetsu under the renewed stage name.

Golden Best debuted at the number-six on the Japanese Oricon chart and climbed the top in September 1999. It became one of the most successful albums for Inoue, entering the record chart for a year with sales of over 1.4 million copies. The label For Life Music Entertainment stated that Golden Best album has sold more than 2.06 million copies up to late 2008.

After a year from the album's release, a sequel entitled Golden Bad came out. And in 2003, when the album shipped more than 2 million units, an expanded edition called Golden Best Super was issued. It features bonus disc which includes his singles in the 2000s and previously unreleased recordings.

Track listing
All songs written and composed by Yōsui Inoue, unless otherwise indicated

Disc one
"" (Inoue, Natsumi Hirai) – 3:21
"" (Inoue, Tamio Okuda) (recorded with Tamio Okuda, credited to InoueYōsuiOkudaTamio) – 3:31
"Make-up Shadow" (Inoue, Utsuru Ayame) – 4:09
"" (Inoue, Okuda) (recorded with Tamio Okuda, credited to InoueYōsuiOkudaTamio) – 3:53
"" – 3:55
"" – 5:35
"" – 4:11
"" – 2:40
"Riverside Hotel" – 3:54
"" – 3:27
"" – 5:06
"" – 3:16
"Crazy Love" – 4:04
"" – 4:43
"" – 4:01
"" – 4:22
"" – 4:51
"" – 5:52

Disc two
"" – 4:52
"" – 3:56
"" – 3:56
"" – 4:13
"" – 5:32
"" – 5:04
"" – 4:59
"" (Inoue, Kōji Tamaki) – 5:25
"" (Inoue, Tamaki) (recorded with Anzen Chitai) – 3:53
"Teenager" (Inoue, Hirai) – 4:34
"Tokyo" (Inoue, Hirai) – 2:58
"" – 4:55
"" (Inoue, Kiyoshiro Imawano) – 4:21
"Just Fit" – 4:25
"" – 4:59
"" – 4:07
"" – 5:38

Bonus disc for 2003 limited edition
"" [Live version recorded at the Tokyo International Forum on March 21, 2003, previously unreleased] – 5:07
""　(Jose Manzo Perroni, Seiji Nakazawa) – 3:07
"" (Koichi Sugiyama, Fusako Sugawara, Rei Nakanishi) – 4:11
"" [Live version recorded at the Pacifico Yokohama on December 23, 2002, previously unreleased] – 3:31
"" – 4:12
"Mis Cast" [Live version recorded at the Tokyo International Forum on March 21, 2003, previously unreleased] – 5:10
"L-O-V-E" [Live version recorded at the Fukuoka Convention Center on January 21, 2003, previously unreleased] – 2:58
"Miss Contest" [Live version recorded at the Bluenote Tokyo on January 6, 2003, previously unreleased] – 4:38
"" [Live version recorded at the Tokyo International Forum on March 21, 2003, previously unreleased] – 5:07
"" (Inoue, Katz Hoshi) [Live version recorded at the Tokyo International Forum on March 21, 2003, previously unreleased] – 4:32

Chart positions

Certification

Release history

References

Yōsui Inoue albums
1999 greatest hits albums